Stempeda is a former municipality in the district of Nordhausen, in Thuringia, Germany. Since 1 December 2007, it is part of the town Nordhausen.

Former municipalities in Thuringia
Nordhausen, Thuringia